"I Don't Understand You" is the second single by the Dutch band K-Otic, from their studio album Indestructible, released in 2002.

Information 
The song was written and produced by Daniel Gibson and released in 2002.

The song has been covered by Spanish-born Mexican singer Belinda ("No Entiendo") for her debut studio album Belinda.

The single debuted at number fifty-six on Dutch Top 40 and peaked at number thirty-eight. It includes an exclusive unreleased demo recording.

Track listing 
CD Single
I Don't Understand You (Main Version)
I Don't Understand You (Acoustic Version)
I Don't Understand You (Instrumental Version)
Don't Wanna Dance On Your Roses

CD Single, Cardboard Sleeve
I Don't Understand You (Main Version)
I Don't Understand You (Instrumental Version)

Charts

No Entiendo 

"No Entiendo" ("I Don't Understand") is the fifth single by Spanish-born Mexican singer Belinda, from her debut studio album Belinda, featuring the Spanish duo Andy & Lucas.

Information 
The song was written by Daniel Gibson, adapted by Belinda, and co-adapted and produced by Mauri Stern. It is a Spanish version of the song "I Don't Understand You", by the band K-Otic.

According to an interview, the Spanish duo performed in a concert in Mexico in the Acapulco Festival in March 2004, where they meet to Belinda. From there followed the idea of recording a duet. It was made in May of that year, in studios of Mexico City.

Track list 
CD Single/Promo (Spain)
 No Entiendo

Music video 
The music video was filmed in November 2004. In the video the Spanish duo es performing the song inside of a room of a department of the Plaza Mayor while Belinda does appear abroad. Belinda is photographed by a child while she's singing. Then goes to the apartment where the duo and they delivered the envelope that includes the digital camera which made the photos along with a dedication to the singer.

Official versions 
 No Entiendo (Solo Version/Album Version)
 No Entiendo (featuring Andy & Lucas)

References 

2002 singles
Belinda Peregrín songs
Pop ballads
Song recordings produced by Mauri Stern